Newville is an unincorporated community in New Britain Township in Bucks County, Pennsylvania, United States. Newville is located at the intersection of Pennsylvania Route 152 and New Galena Road.

References

Unincorporated communities in Bucks County, Pennsylvania
Unincorporated communities in Pennsylvania